"Tin Man" is a song co-written and recorded by American country music artist Miranda Lambert. It was released to radio on April 3, 2017, as the third single from Lambert's sixth studio album The Weight of These Wings (2016). The song was written by Lambert, Jack Ingram and Jon Randall, with an acoustic version appearing on the trio's 2021 collaborative album The Marfa Tapes.

Music video
The music video was directed by Joe DeMaio recorded live at ACM Awards and premiered on CMT, GAC, and Vevo in May 2017.

Critical reception
Billboard and Paste ranked the song number six and number five, respectively, on their lists of the 10 greatest Miranda Lambert songs.

Commercial performance
"Tin Man" was released to country radio on April 3, 2017, quickly following Lambert's performance of the song at the 52nd Academy of Country Music Awards on April 2, 2017. The song re-entered the Hot Country Songs chart at number 15 and debuted on the Hot 100 chart at number 75. On the Country Airplay chart, it debuted at number 53 and went on to peak at number 22.

As of April 2018, it has sold 386,000 copies in the United States.

Accolades

Charts and certifications

Weekly charts

Year-end charts

Certifications

References

2016 songs
2017 singles
Country ballads
2010s ballads
Miranda Lambert songs
RCA Records Nashville singles
Songs written by Miranda Lambert
Songs written by Jon Randall
Song recordings produced by Frank Liddell
Songs written by Jack Ingram